The transportation system in Vatican City, a country  long and  wide, is a small transportation system with no airports or highways. There is no public transport in the country. A heliport and a short railway are used for special occasions only. Most visitors will walk from a nearby Italian bus or train stop, or car parking. Thus, much of the infrastructure in the Vatican consists of St. Peter's Square itself, hallways and aisles in the basilica and surrounding buildings, and walkways behind and between the buildings. The Vatican City Heliport is in the western corner of the city-state, and is used only for officials of the Holy See and official visitors.

Air transport 
Vatican City is served by Vatican City Heliport, sometimes used by official visitors. There is no public airport and visitors may use the two airports of Rome: Ciampino and Fiumicino.

Railway

Rome Metro line A passes the Vatican at Ottaviano and Cipro-Musei Vaticani metro stations. Both stops are a ten-minute walk away from the city-state. The Vatican is also served by Risorgimento / San Pietro tram station, on the 19 route.

Road vehicles

Vehicle registration plates of official road vehicles registered in Vatican City use the prefix SCV, an abbreviation of the Latin Status Civitatis Vaticanae, followed by a series of digits, while vehicle registration plates of residential road vehicles registered in Vatican City use the prefix CV followed by a series of digits. The international identification plate/sticker is V. The Pope's car has usually carried the registration SCV 1 in red lettering. As there is more than one vehicle used to transport the Pope, multiple registered vehicles in Vatican City use the SCV 1 registration plate.

Vehicle fleet
Pope Francis, who called for a more frugal lifestyle for the Catholic clergy in general, downgraded the Papal vehicles (reminiscent of his preference for public transport as Archbishop). He drives himself inside the Vatican in a small 1984 Renault 4 in lieu of the bulletproof popemobile.

See also

Index of Vatican City-related articles
Popemobile

References